Maurice Beke (1 November 1907 – 15 July 1993) was a Belgian wrestler. He competed in the men's freestyle light heavyweight at the 1936 Summer Olympics.

References

External links
 

1907 births
1993 deaths
Belgian male sport wrestlers
Olympic wrestlers of Belgium
Wrestlers at the 1936 Summer Olympics
Place of birth missing